The 2007 Australian Youth Olympic Festival was the fourth edition of the Australian Youth Olympic Festival. It was held from 17 to 21 January 2007.

Participant nations
Of the 23 countries invited, 20 of them participated in the games. They were:

Opening ceremony
The opening ceremony was performed all by primary school and high school students from NSW government schools. Singers and instrumentalists were chosen from outstanding performers from Schools Spectacular 2006.

Events
In 2007, the AYOF had 14 sports (20 disciplines). These were:

 Aquatics
 Diving
 Swimming
 Athletics (track and field)
 Badminton
 Canoeing
 Canoe/Kayak – Slalom
 Canoe/Kayak – Sprint
 Cycling
 Cycling – Road
 Cycling – Track
 Football

 Gymnastics
 Artistic
 Rhythmic
 Trampoline
 Hockey
 Sailing
 Rowing
 Shooting
 Skating
 Figure skating
 Short track
 Table tennis
 Taekwondo

Athletics

There were 40 events contested at an 18 and under age limit:
{|style= "table-layout:fixed; width=95%; margin-top:0;margin-left:0; border-width:1px;border-style:none ;border-color:#ddd; padding:0px; vertical-align:top;"
|-
| valign=top | 
|
|-
| valign=top | 
|
|}

Figure skating
Figure skaters competed in men's and ladies single skating events held on 19 and 20 January 2007 in the Sydney Ice Arena in Sydney.

Men

WD = Withdrawn

Ladies
{| class="wikitable" style="text-align:right;"
|-
! Rank
! Name
! Nation
! Points
! SP
! FS
|- bgcolor="gold"
| align="center" bgcolor="gold" | 1
| align=left| Yuka Ishikawa 
| align=left|  
| 123.44
| 1
| 1
|- bgcolor="silver"
| align="center" bgcolor="silver" | 2
| align=left| Nanoha Sato 
| align=left|  
| 113.70
| 4
| 2
|- bgcolor="cc9966"
| align="center" bgcolor="cc9966" | 3
| align=left| Tina Wang 
| align=left|  
| 110.49
| 3
| 3
|-
! 4
| align=left| Vanessa James 
| align=left|  
| 109.35
| 2
| 5
|-
! 5
| align=left| Yurina Nobuhara 
| align=left|  
| 108.12
| 5
| 4
|-
! 6
| align=left| Cheltzie Lee 
| align=left|  
| 98.21
| 6
| 6
|-
! 7
| align=left| Guo Yalu 
| align=left|  
| 86.78
| 8
| 7
|-
! 8
| align=left| Morgan Figgins 
| align=left|  
| 77.88
| 7
| 10
|-
! 9
| align=left| Phoebe Di Tommaso 
| align=left|  
| 77.30
| 9
| 8
|-
! 10
| align=left| Lejeanne Marais 
| align=left|  
| 74.31
| 10
| 9
|-
! 11
| align=left| Jessica Wai 
| align=left|  
| 62.40
| 11
| 11
|-
! 12
| align=left| Megan Allely 
| align=left|  
| 56.15
| 12
| 12
|-
|}

Rowing

The rowing events were contested at the Sydney International Regatta Centre in Penrith; the site of the rowing for the 2000 Summer Olympics.

Unlike most AYOF events, the rowing offered each Australian state the chance to compete separately against countries including the Great Britain, New Zealand and China. Although the Great Britain and New Zealand teams had recent success at the Junior Rowing World Championships and Under 23 Rowing World Championships, the Australian states still performed competitively. The New South Wales rowing team won the premier event, the Men's Eight.

Great Britain led the way with a total of 6 Gold Medals. The Australian state crews performed admirably with New South Wales, Victoria, Tasmania and Western Australia sharing 14 medals between them.

See also
 Rowing at the 2007 Australian Youth Olympic Festival
 2007 European Youth Summer Olympic Festival

References

External links

Australian Olympic Committee

 
Australian Youth Olympic Festival
Australian Youth Olympic Festival
Australian Youth Olympic Festival
2007 festivals
2007 in youth sport